Joseph Minj (17 October 1932 – 16 August 2018) was an Indian Roman Catholic bishop.

Minj was born in India and was ordained to the priesthood in 1960. He served as the first bishop of the Roman Catholic Diocese of Simdega, India, from 1993 to 2008.

Notes

1932 births
2018 deaths
21st-century Roman Catholic bishops in India
20th-century Roman Catholic bishops in India
People from Simdega district